A Madhouse is a flat ride usually manufactured by Vekoma. A similar attraction under the name Mystery Swing is created by Mack Rides. The ride is designed to be an optical and physical illusion, consisting of several rows of seats attached to a swaying gondola within a rotating drum. The ride creates the impression that the rider is turning upside down, whereas it is actually the room that is moving around them.

The ride is a modern implementation of a haunted swing illusion.

Ride experience
Madhouses are often extensively themed during the ride sequence, and usually in the queue line. Several madhouses feature pre-shows explaining a story behind the ride. Once in the ride, lapbars are lowered onto the riders, before they gradually experience an odd sense of movement. This is achieved through two mechanisms: the separate floor can move in a controlled swing from side-to-side by up to 7.5/15 degrees in each direction, but the surroundings of the room can rotate through a full 360 degrees. The pivot mechanism for the floor is hidden by two large objects at the end of the room, which are themed to match the ride.

At this point, both the floor and the room are slowly moving in unison. As the ride continues, the floor starts a separate movement from the rotating drum which gradually gives the impression that the room is rotating backwards and forwards further each time. Vekoma offers theme parks the option of programming their own sequence of how the room and floor move. In many madhouses, the lighting subtly changes from moment to moment to add to the disorientation. Eventually, the drum mechanism turns through a full rotation and, by careful synchronisation with the sensation of the swinging floor mechanism, the riders are fooled into feeling as if they themselves are being repeatedly turned upside down.

List of Madhouses

Cancelled installations

References

External links
A video showing how a Madhouse works
Official trailer for Hex, a Vekoma Madhouse at Alton Towers
Review of the Haunting Mad House at Drayton Manor

Amusement rides
Dark rides
Vekoma